The Venezuelan Summer League Red Sox, sometimes called the VSL Red Sox, were a Minor League Baseball affiliate of the Boston Red Sox of Major League Baseball (MLB), playing in the foreign Venezuelan Summer League (VSL). The team, classed as a Rookie League franchise, operated between 1999 and 2005. The VSL itself operated from 1997 to 2015.

During most seasons the team operated, it was a cooperative between the Red Sox and one or two other MLB teams. When the team was listed in Red Sox media guides (2003–2005), it was simply referred to as the "VSL Red Sox", although other sources show the team operated under several different names.

Results by year

Both listed managers were Venezuelan former professional players. Rudy Hernandez played as a second baseman and third baseman from 1987 to 1991 for the New York Mets organization. Josman Robles played as a first baseman from 1988 to 1990 for the Atlanta Braves organization.

See also
Notable VSL Red Sox/Padres players (2005)
List of Boston Red Sox minor league affiliates

Notes

References

External links
 2004 Ciudad Alianza roster at baseball-reference.com
 2005 VSL Red Sox/Padres roster at baseball-reference.com

Baseball teams established in 1999
Baseball teams disestablished in 2005
Baseball teams in Venezuela
Boston Red Sox minor league affiliates
Defunct minor league baseball teams
1999 establishments in Venezuela
2005 disestablishments in Venezuela